Vohitra is a monotypic moth genus in the subfamily Lymantriinae erected by Paul Griveaud in 1976. Its only species, Vohitra melissograpta, was first described by Cyril Leslie Collenette in 1936. It is known from Madagascar.

References

Lymantriinae
Monotypic moth genera